Sengoku: Way of the Warrior is a grand strategy computer game developed by Paradox Development Studio and published by Paradox Interactive.

Plot and gameplay
In this game, the player assumes the role of a Japanese noble in 1467. The title means "warring states" and refers to the Sengoku era. The gameplay is similar to Crusader Kings II, another Paradox game. Nobles hold titles giving them an income from their demesne and their vassals. Relationships are based on character traits and situation. Soldiers and fleets are levied from your vassals according to how much they like the player. Mercenaries and hired retinues supplement their levies. Hostages are held to confirm peace treaties.

Reception

The game received "average" reviews according to the review aggregation website Metacritic.

The game was criticized by WarGamer for its lack of missions and the lack of a flexible starting date, atypical for a Paradox game.

See also

List of Paradox Interactive games

References

External links
 
 

2011 video games
Government simulation video games
Grand strategy video games
MacOS games
Paradox Interactive games
Real-time strategy video games
Video games about samurai
Sengoku video games
Video games developed in Sweden
Video games with historical settings
Windows games

Multiplayer and single-player video games